Mark D. Camerer is a retired United States Air Force major general who last served as the commander of the United States Air Force Expeditionary Center. Previously, he was the director of strategic plans, requirements, and programs of the Air Mobility Command.

References

External links

Year of birth missing (living people)
Living people
Place of birth missing (living people)
United States Air Force generals